The 2000 Junior Championships, Wimbledon 2000 Tournament, took place between June 29 and July 9, 2000 in Great Britain. María Emilia Salerni defeated Tatiana Perebiynis in the final, 6–4, 7–5 to win the girls' singles tennis title at the 2000 Wimbledon Championships. Iroda Tulyaganova was the defending champion but did not complete in the Juniors this year.

Seeds

  Dája Bedáňová (first round)
  Tatiana Perebiynis (final)
  Marie-Gaïané Mikaelian (semifinals)
  María Emilia Salerni (champion)
  Anikó Kapros (quarterfinals)
  Christina Wheeler (quarterfinals)
  Ioana Gaspar (semifinals)
  Hannah Collin (third round)
  Lenka Dlhopolcová (third round)
  Gisela Dulko (first round)
  Renata Voráčová (third round)
  Eva Birnerová (first round)
  Alyssa Cohen (third round)
  Ľubomíra Kurhajcová (second round)
  Yuliya Beygelzimer (second round)
  Claudine Schaul (quarterfinals)

Draw

Finals

Top half

Section 1

Section 2

Bottom half

Section 3

Section 4

References

External links

Girls' Singles
Wimbledon Championship by year – Girls' singles